Razamgah (also Romanized as Razamgāh; also known as Razgāh) is a village in Fuladlui Shomali Rural District, Hir District, Ardabil County, Ardabil Province, Iran. At the 2006 census, its population was 97, in 23 families.

References 

Towns and villages in Ardabil County